"So Good" is a song recorded by English singer Louisa Johnson. It was released on 28 October 2016, through Syco. It was written and produced by Steve Mac with additional writing from Chelcee Grimes and Ed Drewett.

Track listing

Live performances
Johnson performed the song for the first time on The X Factor on 30 October 2016. Other major performances of the single include her performance during the Jingle Bell Ball 2016 & 2017, as well as the Summertime Ball 2017.

Charts and certifications

Charts

Certifications

References

2016 singles
2016 songs
Louisa Johnson songs
Songs written by Steve Mac
Songs written by Ed Drewett
Songs written by Chelcee Grimes
Song recordings produced by Steve Mac
Syco Music singles